The Christine Falls Bridge is a reinforced concrete arch bridge in Mount Rainier National Park, spanning Van Trump Creek at Christine Falls. The bridge was built in 1927–1928 by contractor J. D. Tobin of Portland, Oregon, who built the Narada Falls Bridge at the same time. The arch has a three-centered profile and spans . It was faced with rubble stonework and is an example of National Park Service Rustic design.

The bridge was placed on the National Register of Historic Places on March 13, 1991. It is part of the Mount Rainier National Historic Landmark District, which encompasses the entire park and which recognizes the park's inventory of Park Service-designed rustic architecture.

Predecessor bridges
Two other bridges formerly existed at this location. The "Old Christine Falls Bridge", built circa 1908 by the US Army Corps of Engineers, was constructed of wood in a Howe truss design.

The first Christine Falls Bridge was condemned in 1917 because it was "badly decayed". A  bridge was constructed closer to the falls as a replacement.

See also
List of bridges documented by the Historic American Engineering Record in Washington (state)

References

External links

Christine Falls (National Park Service Cultural Landscapes Inventory, Mount Rainier National Park, 2004)

Bridges completed in 1928
Arch bridges in the United States
Bridges in Pierce County, Washington
Road bridges on the National Register of Historic Places in Washington (state)
Historic American Engineering Record in Washington (state)
1928 establishments in Washington (state)
National Register of Historic Places in Mount Rainier National Park
Concrete bridges in the United States
Buildings and structures in Mount Rainier National Park